Artur Kuzmich (born 14 January 2003) is a Belarusian footballer who plays for Minsk.

References

External links

2003 births
Living people
Belarusian footballers
Association football midfielders
FC Minsk players
FC Volna Pinsk players